Future Shock is a science fiction play by Richard Stockwell.  It was first performed in Manchester in 2011, and in Salford in 2012.  Future Shock won the 2011 Best One-Act Play Award by the Drama Association of Wales.

References

2011 plays
Science fiction theatre